10.0 Earthquake is a 2014 American disaster film directed by David Gidali and starring Henry Ian Cusick and Jeffrey Jones.

Plot
As a series of minor earthquakes start tearing apart Los Angeles, scientist Emily of the USGS theorizes that it is all building to a super quake that will drop the entire city into a lava-filled chasm. Engineer Jack whose daughter has gone camping with her friends in the danger area and whose company is responsible for the quakes due to their deep fracking feels obligated to help, and races with Emily through the increasingly damaged city with the hopes of diverting the epicenter to Long Beach and potentially saving millions of lives in the city of Los Angeles.

Cast
 Henry Ian Cusick as Jack
 Jeffrey Jones as Marcus Gladstone
 Cameron Richardson as Emily
 Chasty Ballesteros as Cindy
 Kristen Dalton as Stephanie
 Heather Sossaman as Nicole
 Olivia Jordan as Felicia
 David Chokachi as Reynolds
 Malcolm Barrett as Booker
 Joey Luthman as Teddy Toblosky
 Brock Kelly as Derrick
 Rachel Sterling as Jazmine
 David Barrera as Hector
 David Michael Paul as Warner
 Jason Sims-Prewitt as Lt. Marquez

Soundtrack
Surfing in the Morning
Written by Adam Abildgaard, Nick Duffy, Ted Davis
Performed by Hot Flash Heat Wave
Azucar
Written by Nick Ralph
Performed by The Sidekixx
Rum Runner
Written by Adam Abildgaard, Nick Duffy, Ted Davis
Performed by Hot Flash Heat Wave
Voi Che Sapete
Written by Lorenzo da Ponte
Courtesy of Roman Larkow
Dirty Dreaming
Written by Adam Abildgaard, Nick Duffy, Ted Davis
Performed by Hot Flash Heat Wave
Idea List
Written by Jason Leivian, Michael Newman
Performed by Lava
Mexican Polka Song
Written by Steve Rice
Performed by Steve Rice
Courtesy of Sunset Hill Music
Waltz Opus 64 No 2
Performed by Sergei Novikov
Courtesy of Prolific 1 Publishing
Salt Spray
Written by Adam Abildgaard, Nick Duffy, Ted Davis
Performed by Hot Flash Heat Wave
Dreamwalker
Performed by Gary Wolk
Courtesy of Gary Wolk
Humanwave
Written by Jason Leivian, Michael Newman
Performed by Lava
Hormone
Written by Jason Leivian, Michael Newman
Performed by Lava
Turning Blue
Written by Adam Abildgaard, Nick Duffy, Ted Davis
Performed by Hot Flash Heat Wave
Jump Mix Demo C With Kicks
Written by George Kocovic
Performed by Geo Roc

References

External links

Outpost VFX

2014 films
2010s disaster films
American disaster films
2010s English-language films
Films about earthquakes
Films set in Los Angeles
American action films
Films shot in Los Angeles
2010s American films